Acanthus mollis, commonly known as bear's breeches, sea dock, bear's foot plant, sea holly, gator plant or oyster plant, is a species of plant in the family Acanthaceae and is native to the Mediterranean region. It is a leafy, clump-forming perennial herb, with a rosette of relatively large, lobed or toothed leaves, and purplish and white flowers on an erect spike.

Description
Acanthus mollis is a leafy, clump-forming perennial herb with tuberous roots.

Taxonomy and naming
Acanthus mollis was first formally described in 1753 by Carl Linnaeus in his book Species Plantarum.
The name of the genus derives from the Greek name of the plant  ákanthos; it was imitated in Corinthian capitals. This  ákanthos is related to  ákantha meaning "thorn" referring to the thorn-bearing sepals, or any thorny or prickly plant in Greek.
The Latin name of the species, mollis meaning "soft, smooth", refers to the texture of the leaves.

Distribution and ecology
Although native to the eastern and central Mediterranean, Acanthus mollis has spread throughout much of western Europe and certain parts of the Americas, Australia and New Zealand, where it is regarded as invasive.

Acanthus mollis is entomophilous, pollinated only by bees or bumble bees large enough to force their way between the upper sepal and the lower, so that they can reach the nectar at the bottom of the tube.

Use in horticulture
These plants are usually propagated from tubers and tend to form large, localized clumps which can survive for several decades and look statuesque when well-grown, but its suitability as a garden plant is lessened on account of its invasive nature (new plants are produced readily both from seed and portions of root) and its susceptibility to attacks from slugs and snails.

Cultural depiction
The shape of the leaf of this plant inspired the ancient Greek sculptor Callimachus (5th c. BCE) to model the capital of the Corinthian column. Since then, the Corinthian order column has been used extensively in Greco-Roman and Classical architecture. For centuries, stone or bronze stylized versions of acanthus leaves have appeared as acanthus decorations on certain styles of architecture and furniture. Virgil described Helen of Troy as wearing a dress embroidered with Acanthus leaves.

Gallery

References

External links
 The Introduced Flora of Australia and its Weed Status, by R.P.Randall, Department of Agriculture and Food, Western Australia 
 Biolib
 Acanthus mollis in the Canary Islands
 Malta Wild Plants

mollis
Garden plants of Europe
Garden plants of Africa
Plants described in 1753
Taxa named by Carl Linnaeus
Flora of Malta
Flora of the Mediterranean Basin